Middleton (1822 – after 1833), also known as Chestnut Middleton,  was a British Thoroughbred racehorse and sire. His racing career consisted of a single race: a win in the 1825 Epsom Derby. Training problems prevented him from racing again, and he was retired undefeated to stud. He was exported to Russia in 1833.

Background
Middleton was a big, heavily built chestnut horse with a white blaze bred by his owner  George Child Villiers, 5th Earl of Jersey at his stud at Middleton Stoney in Oxfordshire. His sire, Phantom won the Derby in 1811 and went on to be Champion sire on two occasions. Middleton’s dam, Web, was a half-sister of the Derby winner Whisker and became an extremely successful broodmare, her descendants including the Classic winners Glencoe, Cobweb (Epsom Oaks), Charlotte West (1000 Guineas) and Riddlesworth (2000 Guineas).

Racing career
Middleton was slow to mature and did not run as a two-year-old. In early 1825, however, he performed well in private trial races.
Despite never having raced in public, he became the leading fancy for The Derby and was the subject of much heavy betting for the race, with Lord Jersey and the Duke of Wellington among the biggest gamblers.

On the morning of the race, Middleton was the target of a plan by bookmakers to prevent him winning the race. A stable lad was bribed to allow the colt to drink several buckets of water, leaving him bloated. Edwards responded by giving Middleton a four-mile exercise walk after which he professed himself satisfied with the colt's condition.  Middleton started at odds of 7/4 against seventeen opponents and won cleverly, from Rufus, with Hogarth third. Both Jersey and Wellington reportedly claimed over £1,000 in winning bets.

In autumn, Middleton was entered in several match races but did not run after either he or his opponent was withdrawn.
Middleton began to suffer from Navicular Disease which caused chronic lameness. It proved impossible to run him again, and he was retired to stud with an unbeaten record.

Stud career
Middleton stood as a stallion at the Horse Bazaar, Portman Square, London, where he had little success. In 1833, he was sold and exported to Russia.

Pedigree

References

1822 racehorse births
Epsom Derby winners
Undefeated racehorses
Racehorses bred in the United Kingdom
Racehorses trained in the United Kingdom
Thoroughbred family 1-s
Byerley Turk sire line